Dag Olav Hessen (born 6 July 1956) is a Norwegian writer and biologist, known for his work in the field of ecology.

He is a member of the Norwegian Academy of Science and Letters. He was awarded the Riksmål Society Literature Prize in 2008, and the Fritt Ord Honorary Award in 2010.

References

1956 births
Living people
Norwegian biologists
Academic staff of the University of Oslo
Members of the Norwegian Academy of Science and Letters